Visa requirements for Palestinian citizens, are administrative entry restrictions by the authorities of other states which are imposed on citizens of Palestine who holds a passport issued by the Palestinian Authority. As of 13 October 2020, Palestinian citizens had visa-free or visa on arrival access to 38 countries and territories, ranking the Palestinian passport 101st in terms of travel freedom (tied with passports issued by Libya and Nepal) according to the Henley Passport Index.

Visa requirements map

Visa requirements

See also

Visa policy of Palestine
Palestinian passport
International recognition of Palestine

References and Notes
References

Notes

Palestine